Japanese submarines in the Pacific War consisted of 169 boats of the Imperial Japanese Navy. During the war Japanese submarines sank two US aircraft carriers, a cruiser and numerous other warships. Later they became used to resupply isolated island garrisons. The Japanese began the war with an advanced submarine torpedo design, the Type 95.

Operations

Midget submarines
Japanese midget submarines were involved many actions during the Pacific war including the attacks on Pearl Harbor and Sydney Harbour.

Attacks on North America
Japanese submarines shelled and carried out reconnaissance on the west coast of the continental United States. Later in the war, there were plans for a four boat, 10-airplane attack on the Panama Canal using the I-400 class submarine, but these plans had to be abandoned.

USS Indianapolis
The  sank the heavy cruiser  shortly after it delivered parts for the atomic bomb Little Boy to the island of Tinian. The loss of the Indianapolis was not noticed for four days, which resulted in the deaths of hundreds of American sailors at sea, and constituted the greatest loss of life at sea in a single incident in the history of the United States Navy.

Yanagi Missions

After 1942, submarines became the only remaining supply link between Nazi Germany and Japan, and trade was focused on strategic materials, technical plans and blueprints.

Before I-29 embarked on her voyage to German-occupied France in December 1943, she had previously rendezvoused with the  during an earlier mission to the Indian Ocean. During this meeting on 28 April 1943, Indian nationalist Subhas Chandra Bose was transferred to I-29 to become the only civilian exchanged between two submarines of two different navies in World War II.

See also
 Allied submarines in the Pacific War
 Imperial Japanese Navy submarines

References

Pacific Ocean theatre of World War II
Submarine warfare in World War II
Submarines